"Sweet Dreams" is a song by English/Australian soft rock duo Air Supply from their sixth album, The One That You Love. The song reached No. 5 on the Billboard Hot 100 and No. 4 on the Adult Contemporary chart in early 1982. 
 The song also reached No. 8 on Cash Box. In Canada, it peaked at No. 14 on the RPM Top 100 and No. 15 on the Adult Contemporary chart.

Record World described it as an "emotional ballad" in which singers "Graham Russell and Russell Hitchcock give a command performance."

Charts

Weekly charts

Track listing 
U.S. 7" single
A. "Sweet Dreams" - 3:46
B. "Don't Turn Me Away" - 3:39

References

External links
 

1981 songs
1981 singles
Air Supply songs
Songs written by Graham Russell
Song recordings produced by Harry Maslin
Arista Records singles
1980s ballads